Nakhal Para Hossain Ali High School is a private secondary school in Tejgaon, Dhaka, the capital of Bangladesh. The school offers education for students from Nursery group upto SSC (10).

History
20 February 1957 was a memorable day for residents of Nakhal Para. On this day Al-hazz Moron Ali established the school named for his father, Al-hazz Hossain Ali.

Description and location 

The school is in Nakhalpara in Tejgaon Thana under the Dhaka district. It is west facing. It has three buildings (1st building 3 storied, 2nd building 5 storied and 3rd building is 10 storied) . It has a playground. It has about 29 (Temporarily) rooms, one is for the headmaster, one is for the assistant headmasters, one is an office room and two are for teachers and rest for classrooms. It has a library room, a computer lab, a canteen, a school garden, and a "Shaheed Minar."

Time and students 
There are 5,000 students (approx.) in Nakhal Para Hossain Ali High School. Classes are taken through two shifts: morning and day. The classes begin at 8:30 am morning and break at 12 noon as the morning shift which is for girls. The day shift sits at 12:30 pm and breaks a t5 pm. The time changes a bit during the winter and Ramadan.

Activities 
Nakhal Para Hossain Ali High School arranges annual sports days. It also arranges annual cultural day, annual Milad mahfil, etc. It publishes a school magazine. Debate competitions and prize-giving ceremonies are held annually.

Teachers 
The school has about 70 teachers. Abdul Jobbar Haolader is the headmaster. The teachers are highly qualified.

Gallery

References

High schools in Bangladesh
1957 establishments in East Pakistan
Schools in Dhaka District